"Ninna nanna" is a single by Italian rapper Ghali, released on 28 October 2016 as the first extract from his first studio album Album. The single earned 4 platinum discs in Italy, having sold over 200,000 copies.

Description 
Produced by Charlie Charles, the track was originally released on 14 October 2016 on the music streaming platform Spotify, achieving gold disc certification just fourteen days after its release. The cover is the work of Giuseppe Palmisano (aka Iosonopipo), who created the artwork based on Ghali's idea of being portrayed with his mother.

The rapper himself commented on the song with these words: "It took a while, that's how I am, I'm a perfectionist when it comes to my music, but I can assure you that "Ninna nanna" is the best single I've written to date".

Tracks

References

External links 

 https://www.youtube.com/watch?v=s1xbQVNGSPQ
 

2016 singles
2016 songs

Trap music songs